Alfons "Fons" Steuten (23 February 1938 – 22 September 1991) was a Dutch cyclist. He won the 1976 Rás Tailteann.

Biography
Steuten was born in Weert, Netherlands in 1938.

Steuten competed in the 1962 Vuelta a España, 1964 Vuelta a España and the 1964 Tour de France. Steuten won the Rás Tailteann in Ireland in June 1976.

Steuten died in Weert in 1991.

References 

1938 births
1991 deaths
Dutch male cyclists
Rás Tailteann winners